Class 94 may refer to:

 DRG or DR Class 94, a class of German tank locomotive with a 0-10-0 wheel arrangement operated by the Deutsche Reichsbahn and comprising:
 Class 94.0: Palatine T 5 
 Class 94.1: Württemberg Tn 
 Class 94.2-4: Prussian T 16 
 Class 94.5-17: Prussian T 16.1 
 Class 94.19-21: Saxon XI HT
 Class 94.67: various locomotives taken over in 1949 by the Deutsche Reichsbahn (GDR)